The .577 Tyrannosaur or .577 T-Rex (14.9×76mm) is a very large and powerful rifle cartridge developed by A-Square in 1993 on request for professional guides in Zimbabwe who escort clients hunting dangerous game.  The cartridge is designed for use in "stopping rifles" intended to stop the charge of dangerous game.  The 577 contains a  diameter  monolithic solid projectile which when fired moves at  producing  of muzzle energy.  The production model from A-square is based on their Hannibal rifle.

References

External links
Video of Arthur Alphin talking with David Petzal about the A-Square .577 T-Rex

Pistol and rifle cartridges